Çalkıran is a village in the Tunceli District, Tunceli Province, Turkey. The village is populated by Kurds of the Kurêşan and Yusufan tribes and had a population of 26 in 2021.

The hamlets of Çiçekli and Gökçeler are attached to the village.

References 

Villages in Tunceli District
Kurdish settlements in Tunceli Province